Wessobrunn is a municipality in the district of Weilheim-Schongau in Bavaria in Germany.

Paterzell airfield
Paterzell airfield is located in Wessobrunn. The local aeroclub Luftsportverein Weilheim-Peißenberg competes in glider aerobatics.  The German National Champion in 2006,  Markus Feyerabend and Hans-Georg Resch are members of the German national team.

References

Weilheim-Schongau